Christopher "Chris" Gore (1944–1988) was an American screenwriter, playwright, and lyricist. Gore wrote the screenplay for the 1980 musical film Fame, for which he received a nomination for the Academy Award for Best Original Screenplay.

Gore was born on August 10, 1944, in Fort Lauderdale, Florida. Shortly after graduating from Northwestern University, Gore began writing plays and musicals. One of his early works, Mary, was a musical about Mary, Queen of Scots that was produced in Fort Lauderdale, Florida in 1967. His first Broadway show, Via Galactica, which he wrote with Judith Ross and Galt MacDermot, premiered in 1972. In 1977, he also wrote the book and lyrics for a musical about the Egyptian queen Nefertiti.

Although his obituary in The New York Times (citing his mother) stated that Gore died of cancer, subsequent reports now accurately state that he died of AIDS on May 18, 1988 at age 43 in Santa Monica, California.

References

External links
 

1944 births
1988 deaths
20th-century American dramatists and playwrights
American lyricists
Northwestern University alumni
Writers from Fort Lauderdale, Florida
20th-century American male writers
20th-century American LGBT people
AIDS-related deaths in California
American gay writers